The FBI in Peace and War was a radio crime drama inspired by Frederick Lewis Collins' book of the same name.

The idea for the show came from Louis Pelletier who wrote many of the scripts. Among the show's other writers were Jack Finke, Ed Adamson and Collins. It aired on CBS from November 25, 1944 to September 28, 1958, produced and directed by Max Marcin and Betty Mandeville. The show had a variety of sponsors over the years, including Lava Soap, Wildroot Cream-Oil, Lucky Strike, Nescafe and Wrigley's. 

In 1955 it was the eighth most popular show on radio, as noted in Time:
The Nielsen ratings of the top ten radio shows seemed to indicate that not much has changed in radio: 1) Jack Benny Show (CBA), 2) Amos 'n' Andy (CBS), 3) People are Funny (NBC), 4) Our Miss Brooks (CBS) 5) Lux Radio Theater (NBC), 6) My Little Margie (CBS), 7) Dragnet (NBC), 8) FBI in Peace and War (CBS), 9) Bergen and McCarthy (CBS), 10) Groucho Marx (NBC).

Martin Blaine and Donald Briggs headed the cast. The theme was the March from Prokofiev's The Love for Three Oranges, arranged for small symphony orchestra by Amedeo De Filippi, with Vladimir Selinksy conducting. The music was accompanied by a chant of "L-A-V-A," in reference to the show's sponsor being Lava soap.

Actress Lisa Loughlin also voiced for the show beginning in 1952.

References

Listen to
The FBI in Peace and War, radiolovers.com (archive.org)
Episodes of The FBI in Peace and War, archive.org

External links
1952 Scripts: The FBI in Peace and War was a summer replacement series sponsored by Lucky Strike. Scripts from the tobacco litigation begin with  “Brass Knuckles” (1952-06-12) and include “The False Step” (1952-06-19), “Trouble Shooter” (1952-06-26), “The Big Yarn” (1952-07-03), “The Psycho Case” (1952-07-17), “The Entry Fee” (1952-07-31), “The Fence” (1952-08-07), “The Super Salesman” (1952-08-14), “The Bait” (1952-08-21), “The Carlson Plan” (1952-08-28), “The Serpent Ring” (1952-09-04), “The 12th Man” (1952-09-11).
Jerry Haendiges, Vintage Radio Logs: The FBI in Peace and War
Betty Mandeville production papers, 1947-58, nypl.org

American radio dramas
1940s American radio programs
1950s American radio programs
CBS Radio programs